Andy Setyo Nugroho (born 16 September 1997 in Pati, Central Java Province) is an Indonesian professional footballer who plays as a centre-back for Liga 1 club Persikabo 1973 and the Indonesia national team. He is also a first sergeant in the Indonesian Army.

Club career

Persikabo 1973
Andy Setyo entered the Indonesian army before he played professional football. He trained with the military-owned team PS TNI before the team decided to participate in top-flight football in the 2016 Indonesia Soccer Championship A. He stayed with the club when it competed in the 2017 Liga 1 and 2018 Liga 1 seasons. He has remained a loyal part of the team throughout its dynamic journey that included name changes and a 2019 merger with Liga 3 club Persikabo Bogor. The merger led to a name change to TIRA-Persikabo and base relocation to Bogor Regency in West Java province. Since 2020, the team has been known as Persikabo 1973 to dilute the military association.

International career
He made his international debut for the Indonesia u-23 team on 22 August 2017 in the 2017 Southeast Asian Games, against Vietnam u-23. He captained the U-23 team that won silver in the 2019 Southeast Asian Games in the Philippines.  He made his official debut for senior team on 25 November in a friendly match against Guyana, where he came as a substitute. In November 2022, it was reported that Andy received a call-up from the Indonesia for a training camp, in preparation for the 2022 AFF Championship.

Career statistics

Club

International appearances

International goals
International under-23 goals

Honours

Club
PS TNI U-21
 Indonesia Soccer Championship U-21: 2016

International 
Indonesia U-23
 Southeast Asian Games  Bronze medal: 2017
 Southeast Asian Games  Silver medal: 2019
 AFF U-22 Youth Championship: 2019
Indonesia
 Aceh World Solidarity Cup runner-up: 2017

References

External links
 
 

Living people
1997 births
Indonesian footballers
Association football defenders
Liga 1 (Indonesia) players
Persikabo 1973 players
Indonesia youth international footballers
People from Pati Regency
Sportspeople from Central Java
Indonesian military personnel
Southeast Asian Games bronze medalists for Indonesia
Southeast Asian Games medalists in football
Footballers at the 2018 Asian Games
Competitors at the 2017 Southeast Asian Games
Asian Games competitors for Indonesia
Competitors at the 2019 Southeast Asian Games
Southeast Asian Games silver medalists for Indonesia
Indonesia international footballers